The 1900 Minnesota gubernatorial election took place on November 6, 1900. Republican Party of Minnesota candidate Samuel Rinnah Van Sant narrowly defeated incumbent Democratic Party of Minnesota Governor John Lind. This was the third of three successive elections in which Lind headed a coalition of the Democrats with the People's Party.

Results

See also
 List of Minnesota gubernatorial elections

External links
 http://www.sos.state.mn.us/home/index.asp?page=653
 http://www.sos.state.mn.us/home/index.asp?page=657

Minnesota
Gubernatorial
1900
November 1900 events